The Louis D. Brandeis Award of the U.S. Federal Trade Commission is given during an annual award ceremony to a single litigation attorney for outstanding service.

Recipients include the following:

2002 - James Kohm
2004 - Heather Hippsley
2006 - Joseph Brownman
2008 - Leslie Melman
2010 - Steven Wernikoff
2018 - Patricia McDermott

See also

 List of legal awards

References

Legal awards